The  ("The Bandō 33 Kannon Pilgrimage") is a series of 33 Buddhist temples in Eastern Japan sacred to Goddess Kannon. Bandō is the old name for what is now the Kantō region, used in this case because the temples are all in the Prefectures of Kanagawa, Saitama, Tokyo, Gunma, Ibaraki, Tochigi and Chiba. As is the case with all such circuits, each location has a rank, and pilgrims believe that visiting them all in order is an act of great religious merit.

Started by Minamoto no Yoritomo and his son Sanetomo, the Bandō Sanjūsankasho is just one of 70 different Kannon pilgrimage circuits existing in Japan, each including 33 temples because the Goddess is believed to have 33 different manifestations. Sugimoto-dera in Kamakura is number one, Zushi's Gandenji's is number two, An'yō-in in Kamakura is the number three, the famous Hasedera in Hase number four, and so on. From its beginning at Sugimotodera to its end in Chiba's Nagodera, the circuit is over 1300 km long. Even though women were allowed to pray at individual temples, the circuit was originally reserved to male pilgrims. Now however most of the pilgrims are women. Pilgrims leave behind a slip of paper  or a sticker as a proof of their visit, and many of these can be seen plastered on temple walls and pillars.

The 33 temples of the Bandō Sanjūsankasho circuit

See also 
 Japan 100 Kannon, pilgrimage composed of the Saigoku, Bandō and Chichibu pilgrimages.
 Saigoku 33 Kannon, pilgrimage in the Kansai region. 
 Chichibu 34 Kannon, pilgrimage in Saitama Prefecture.
 Shikoku Pilgrimage, 88 Temple pilgrimage in the Shikoku island. 
 Musashino Kannon Pilgrimage, pilgrimage in Tokyo and Saitama prefectures.
 Chūgoku 33 Kannon, pilgrimage in the Chūgoku region.
 Kannon
 Buddhism in Japan
 Tourism in Japan
 For an explanation of terms concerning Japanese Buddhism, Japanese Buddhist art, and Japanese Buddhist temple architecture, see the Glossary of Japanese Buddhism.

Notes

References 
 Donald Richie. Pilgrimage for the 21st century accessed on April 17, 2008 
 Iso Mutsu. ''Kamakura: Fact and Legend', Tuttle Publishing (1995/06)

External links 
 The Circuit's site 

Buddhist temples in Kanagawa Prefecture
Buddhist temples in Ibaraki Prefecture
Buddhist temples in Kamakura, Kanagawa
Buddhist pilgrimages
Japanese pilgrimages